Thomas E. Knight, Jr. (June 19, 1898 – May 17, 1937) was an American lawyer and politician who served as the 13th Lieutenant Governor of Alabama from 1935 to 1937, as well as the 19th Attorney General of Alabama from 1931 to 1935. He was a native of Greensboro, Alabama.

Knight was the prosecutor in the Scottsboro trials in the 1930s; as the Attorney General, he also represented the State before the United States Supreme Court in the three cases stemming from the trials: Powell v. Alabama, in 1932; and Norris v. Alabama and Patterson v. Alabama, both in 1935.

Knight died suddenly on May 17, 1937, in Montgomery, Alabama, due to complications from kidney and liver conditions.

Popular culture

Knight was portrayed by actor Bill Sage in the 2006 movie Heavens Fall, opposing Timothy Hutton, starring as Scottsboro Boys defense attorney Samuel Leibowitz.

Knight was portrayed by actor Ken Kercheval in the 1976 TV movie Judge Horton and the Scottsboro Boys.

External links
Biography by the Alabama Department of Archives & History
Biography by UMKC School of Law

References 

Lieutenant Governors of Alabama
1898 births
1937 deaths
People from Greensboro, Alabama
Alabama lawyers
Alabama Democrats
Alabama Attorneys General
20th-century American politicians
20th-century American lawyers